The 2014 Matador BBQs One-Day Cup was the 45th season of the official List A domestic cricket competition in Australia. It was played over a four-week period at the start of the domestic season to separate its schedule from the Sheffield Shield, held after the tournament's conclusion. The tournament was held in Sydney and Brisbane, with most matches broadcast live on free-to-air television on GEM. Western Australia defeated New South Wales in the final to win the title for the first time in 11 years.

Points table

Fixtures

Preliminary final

Final

References

External links
 Matador BBQs One-Day Cup 2014/15 on ESPN Cricinfo
 on Cricket Australia

Matador BBQs One-Day Cup
Australian domestic limited-overs cricket tournament seasons
Matador BBQs One-Day Cup